Live birth may refer to:
viviparity
in human reproduction, the birth of a living child (as opposed to stillborn), see  Live birth (human)